Sophiya Bhujel (born 1 January 1996) is a Nepalese beauty pageant titleholder, entrepreneur, model and social worker who was crowned as Miss Universe Nepal 2022. She will represent Nepal at Miss Universe 2022. She worked at many social organizations in Nepal and became a renowned social worker. She has participated in many beauty pageants throughout 2019 to 2022.

Early life
Sophiya Bhujel was born in Kathmandu. Sophiya was completed her education up to Grade 6 at Mount Hermon School in Darjeeling, India. She graduated with a bachelor's degree in Business Management in India,

Pageant career
On 9 May 2019, Bhujel entered the silver jubilee edition of Miss Nepal 2019 at age 23. She ended up placing as a Top 7 Finalist and the event was held at the Laboratory H.S. School premises in Kirtipur, Nepal. She was appointed to represent Nepal in Global Asian Model the same year. On 21 November 2019, Sophiya competed in Global Asian Model 2019. She ended up placing as a Top 10 Finalist and the event was held at the Cove Theatre inside Okada Manila in Parañaque, Philippines. 3 years later in 2022, Sophiya on 2 March 2022, was appointed to represent Nepal internationally in Miss Eco International 2022. At Miss Eco International 2022 on 18 March 2022, she ended up placing in the Top 20 which is equalling their best result since 2019. She participated in Miss Universe Nepal 2022 where she won the opportunity to represent Nepal at Miss Universe and she also won the title of Social Impact Leader during the pageant. 

In an interview she said that she participated to achieve her dreams as Miss Universe Nepal, as it was her biggest dream ever since she participated in Miss Nepal 2019 to be the representative of Nepal in Miss Universe. Her social advocacy is Project RED which is about providing the underprivileged communities and others in Nepal free access to period and menstruation products. She will represent Nepal at Miss Universe 2022 in New Orleans, Louisiana, US.

Pageants trivia

References

External links
Miss Nepal Website
Miss Universe Nepal Website

Living people
1996 births
Miss Nepal winners
Nepalese beauty pageant winners
Miss Universe 2022 contestants
People from Kathmandu